Apollonides was an ancient Greek male name.

Apollonides of Smyrna or Apollonides Smyrnaeus, epigrammatist
Apollonides of Sicyon fl. 186 BC, Achaean statesman
Apollonides (physician), a physician who lived around the 1st or 2nd century
Apollonides (governor of Argos), appointed by Cassander by 315 BC
Apollonides of Boeotia, ancient Greek soldier
Apollonides of Cardia, contemporary of Philip of Macedonia
Apollonides of Chios, chief of Persian guard in Chios at the time of Alexander the Great, 332 BC
Apollonides of Cos, Greek physician of the 5th century BC, and a central character of Ctesias' history
Apollonides of Nicaea, Greek grammarian of the time of Emperor Tiberius
Apollonides (philosopher), stoic philosopher of the 1st century, friend of Cato the Younger
Apollonides of Olynthus, a general in the time of Philip II of Macedon
Apollonides of Orapius, ancient Greek writer who wrote a work on Egypt
Apollonides of Sparta, treasurer of 2nd century BCE
Apollonides of Syracuse, a notable citizen during the Second Punic War
Apollonides (poet), tragic poet